Virgin Samoa, formerly Polynesian Blue, was the flag carrier of Samoa. It was owned by Virgin Australia Holdings (49%), the Government of Samoa (49%) and Grey Investment Group (2%). Polynesian Blue took over the long haul flights (those involving Australia or New Zealand) which were operated by Polynesian Airlines.  In December 2011 Polynesian Blue was renamed Virgin Samoa. It ceased operations on 12 November 2017.

History

In 2005 Virgin Blue Holdings signed an agreement with the Government of Samoa to operate a joint venture airline. The announcement came after several months of detailed discussions between the two parties and involved the Samoan government and Virgin Blue joining forces to set up a new company to operate jet routes previously flown by Polynesian Airlines. The name Polynesian Blue adopted in keeping with the Virgin Blue family of brands, which also included Christchurch based Pacific Blue Airlines. Its first flight was on 31 October 2005, between Apia, Auckland and Sydney.

The airline was owned by Virgin Australia Holdings (49%), the Government of Samoa (49%) and Grey Investment Group (2%).

Pacific Blue Airlines changed its ICAO code from PBI to PBN to prevent air traffic controllers confusing the I for a 1 in flight plans. This also applies to Virgin Samoa flights operated by Virgin Australia. The ICAO code PLB (Callsign: Polyblue) is currently reserved for the airline but not in use.

Virgin Blue Holdings rebranded its airlines under the new Virgin Australia name in 2011, later renaming itself Virgin Australia Holdings. Polynesian Blue was rebranded Virgin Samoa and a new livery was unveiled for one of the Boeing 737-800s operated by Virgin Australia (NZ) - which features traditional Samoan tattoos on the engines, designed by Tuifa’asisina Tolouena Sua. Cabin crew uniforms were also redesigned to feature the new imagery.

In 2015 Virgin Australia decided to relinquish its New Zealand Air Operators Certificate with all New Zealand registered aircraft, including the Virgin Samoa branded aircraft, transferred to the Australian register.

In May 2017, the Prime Minister of Samoa, Tuilaepa Aiono Sailele Malielegaoi, wrote to Virgin Australia advising of the government's intention to withdraw from the joint venture. This followed two years of the government's unhappiness that Samoan customers and government were not obtaining enough of the benefits from the joint venture. Virgin Australia later confirmed that services would cease on 12 November 2017. The government proposes Polynesian Airlines resume operating long-distance flights while Virgin Australia commenced operating services to Samoa on 13 November 2017 in its own right.

Destinations

Before its cessation on 12 November 2017, Virgin Samoa operated scheduled passenger flights from Apia to the following destinations:

Fleet

Virgin Samoa did not own any of its own aircraft. All flights were operated on behalf of Virgin Samoa by Virgin Australia International Airlines. One of Virgin Australia's Boeing 737-800 aircraft was painted in Virgin Samoa livery and named Tapu I'Tea.

See also
List of defunct airlines of Australia

References

External links

Airlines established in 2005
Airlines disestablished in 2017
Airlines of Samoa
Defunct airlines of Australia
Defunct airlines of Oceania
S
2005 establishments in Samoa
2017 disestablishments in Samoa